Greatest Hits is the first compilation album by English boy band Five. It was released in the United Kingdom through RCA Records on 19 November 2001, just three months after the release of their third studio album, Kingsize. "Closer to Me" and "Rock the Party" was released as double single on United Kingdom and Ireland. The album was executively produced by Simon Cowell and Richard "Biff" Stannard. In other countries, the songs were released as separate singles. The songs was included in the previous album Kingsize (2001).

The album features thirteen of the band's fifteen singles, excluding "How Do Ya Feel", and the international-only release "Don't Fight It Baby", as well as two popular B-sides, two brand new remixes, and the original track, "Set Me Free", which was recorded during the Kingsize album sessions. The album peaked at number nine on the UK Albums Chart, as well as being certified platinum by the BPI. The album was executively produced by Simon Cowell and Richard "Biff" Stannard.

Background
Despite Kingsize only being released three months earlier, Greatest Hits was rush-released due to the imminent split of the band. Scott Robinson revealed on the ITV2 documentary The Big Reunion that the album's release came after Sean Conlon suffered a mental breakdown and threatened to quit the band as he was unable to cope. Alongside the release of the album, a VHS compilation containing all of the band's music videos, as well as behind the scenes footage, and a live video for "Two Sides to Every Story". The band's last ever British single, "Closer to Me", was used to promote the compilation in the United Kingdom, featuring footage from across the band's history.

The Japanese version of the album does not include B-side "Inspector Gadget", but instead re-instates one of the missing singles, "How Do Ya Feel", and also includes a bonus remix of "Let's Dance" that does not appear on any other version of the release. The album was re-released on 7 June 2003. The album made a return to the top ten of UK Albums Chart in 2013, due to the band reforming to appear on The Big Reunion.

Track listing

Personnel
Abz Love — vocals
Jason "J" Brown — vocals
Sean Conlon — vocals
Ritchie Neville — vocals
Scott Robinson — vocals
Producers: Julian Gallagher, Richard Stannard, StarGate, Steve Mac, Ben Chapman
Mixing: Ash Howes, StarGate, Ben Chapman
Engineers: Ben Chapman, Matt Howe, Daniel Pursey, Robin Sellers, Ben Coombs
Programming: Ash Howes, Martin Harrington
Arrangers: Julian Gallagher, Richard Stannard, Dave Arch
Backing vocals: Andy Caine, Richard Stannard, Sharon Murphy, Eliot Kennedy, Tim Woodcock

Charts

Weekly charts

Year-end charts

Certifications and sales

References

2001 greatest hits albums
Five (band) albums
RCA Records compilation albums
Albums produced by Richard Stannard (songwriter)